Reichlingia is a genus of lichen-forming fungi in the family Arthoniaceae. It has seven species. The genus was originally circumscribed by Paul Diederich and Christoph Scheidegger in 1996, with Reichlingia leopoldii as the type, and at that time, only species. The fungus was at first thought to be a lichenicolous (lichen-dwelling) fungus, but is now considered a lichenised hyphomycete.

Species
 Reichlingia americana 
 Reichlingia anombrophila 
 Reichlingia dendritica 
 Reichlingia leopoldii 
 Reichlingia syncesioides 
 Reichlingia virginea 
 Reichlingia zwackhii

References

Arthoniaceae
Lichen genera
Taxa described in 1996
Arthoniomycetes genera